Jeffrey Daniels may refer to:

Jeffrey Daniels (architect) (born 1953), American architect
Jeffrey Daniels (author), author and professor
Jeff Daniels (born 1955), American actor
Jeff Daniels (director) (born 1978), American/Australian documentary film-maker
Jeff Daniels (ice hockey) (born 1968), retired professional ice hockey player
Jeff Daniels, pseudonym used by country singer Luke McDaniel (1927–1992)

See also
Jeffrey Daniel (MP) (1626–1681), English politician
Jeffrey Daniel (often misspelled as Jeffrey Daniels), American dancer, singer-songwriter and choreographer